= Text-to-Pledge =

Text-to-Pledge (TTP) is a mobile devices program for pledging charitable contributions. The technology is generally employed by non-profit organizations to increase donations at live fundraising events in the United States.

== Use ==
TTP is most commonly used by charities at gala events. The program allows guests to use their mobile device to pledge to prospective charities via text message.

Text-to-Pledge provides on-screen content, including interactive text messaging and impact visuals, to encourage mobile giving. Event can choose to display their name, donation amount and a brief message when they donate or can choose to give anonymously.

According to an article published by Mobile Commerce Daily, Sophist's Text-to-Pledge CEO Reed Baker explained the differentiating factor between apps and text-giving programs:

“Apps require access… The likelihood that an organization could convince 1,000 people, many of whom are unregistered guests of table sponsors, to download something to their phone is a lot lower than asking all of these people to use something they use every day, and may even be using while you ask — that something would be text messaging.”

Baker provides fundraising consulting for his clients For example, Baker recommended running the Text-to-Pledge program during dinner and asking a well-known figure to announce the opportunity to give on stage.

== History ==
Baker founded Text-to-Pledge in 2008. Text-to-Pledge was nominated for a BizBash Event Style Award in the Best Fresh Idea category in 2008 and 2009. Since its founding, the program has raised in excess of $25 million for charity events around the United States.
